Donald William McCafferty (March 12, 1921 – July 28, 1974) was an American football player and coach who, in his first year as head coach of the Baltimore Colts, led the team to a victory in Super Bowl V, and became the first rookie head coach to win the Super Bowl.

College career
McCafferty played college football for Ohio State University under coach Paul Brown, where he was a key member of the offensive line.  Due to World War II, he was one of a select group of players to play twice in the annual College All-Star Game held in Chicago.

Professional career
After moving on to the National Football League (NFL), McCafferty was shifted to wide receiver, playing one season with the New York Giants in 1946.

Coaching career
After working in the Cleveland, Ohio, recreation department the following year, he was hired as an assistant at Kent State University in 1948.  He spent eleven seasons with the Golden Flashes until accepting an assistant coaching position with the Baltimore Colts in 1959 under head coach Weeb Ewbank.  During that first season at the professional level, McCafferty was part of the Colts' second straight championship team.

When Ewbank was fired after the 1962 season, McCafferty remained with the team as offensive backs coach under new head coach Don Shula.  McCafferty's easy-going personality helped serve as a buffer against the demanding Shula's quest for perfection, a contrast that played a major part in the team's three NFL playoff appearances during the next seven years.  Colts' Hall of Fame quarterback Johnny Unitas once said about McCafferty, "He doesn't shout and scream.  He's able to look at football objectively without getting carried away emotionally."  He was referred to in the press and by the Colts players as "Easy Rider."

When Shula left after seven seasons in February 1970 for the Miami Dolphins, McCafferty was promoted to head coach on April 6, then led the Colts that season to an 11–2–1 record and their second Super Bowl appearance in three years.  In the mistake-filled Super Bowl V against the Dallas Cowboys, the Colts won 16–13 on a last-second field goal by rookie Jim O'Brien.

The Colts once again reached the playoffs in 1971, but were shut out 21–0 in the AFC Championship game by Shula's Dolphins in the Orange Bowl. Ownership changed in 1972, and after only one win in the team's first five games, the last a 21–0 home shutout loss to Dallas, general manager Joe Thomas ordered the 39-year-old Unitas benched as the team's quarterback; when McCafferty refused, he was fired.

McCafferty signed a three-year contract as head coach of the Detroit Lions three months later on January 26, 1973. He succeeded Joe Schmidt who had resigned two weeks prior. The Lions finished 6–7–1 in McCafferty's only season in 1973. On Sunday, July 28, 1974, while spending some time at his nearby home in West Bloomfield, Michigan, he suffered a heart attack while mowing his lawn. After being transported to a Pontiac hospital, he died at age 53, and was buried three days later, following services at Dulaney Valley Memorial Gardens in Timonium, Maryland.

Head coaching record

References

External links

 

1921 births
1974 deaths
American football ends
Baltimore Colts coaches
Detroit Lions coaches
Kent State Golden Flashes football coaches
New York Giants players
Ohio State Buckeyes football players
Sportspeople from Cleveland
Players of American football from Cleveland
People from West Bloomfield, Michigan
Burials at Dulaney Valley Memorial Gardens
Super Bowl-winning head coaches
Detroit Lions head coaches
Baltimore Colts head coaches